The Rocky Mountain Emmy Awards are a division of the National Academy of Television Arts and Sciences. The Rocky Mountain Southwest chapter was founded in 1959, and is responsible for granting the Rocky Mountain Emmy Awards, awarding scholarships, honoring industry veterans with the Gold & Silver Circle Society, conducting Student Production Awards, and operates a free research and a nationwide job bank. The chapter also participates in judging Emmy entries at the regional and national levels.

Boundaries

The academy is divided into the following boundaries and encompasses the states of Arizona, New Mexico, Utah and El Centro, California. These boundaries are responsible for the submission of television broadcast materials presented for awards considerations.

Board of Governors

The Board of Governors is a working board, which works together collaboratively to ensure they are providing for the best interests of the membership.

Executive Committee

President & Trustee - Doug Mummert, Phoenix Fire Foundation

1st Vice President - Mark Reda,  ASU

2nd Vice President & Trustee - Theresa Maher,  Hire Story

Treasurer - Suzanne Guery,  PBS (Ret.)

Secretary - Jennifer Doan,  Fox 10 Phoenix

Alternate Trustee - Warren Trent,  AZ Family

Executive Director - Lara Gates

Board of Governors, 2020-2021

Dan J.P. Ciernia, M.Ed., AZ POST

Chuck Emmert, Know99

Mike Headrick, KSL (Utah)

Krystle Henderson, 12News

Micah Johnson, MediaStars

Carol Lynde, Tall Paul Productions

Chris Schueler, Christoper Productions (New Mexico)

Gina Santiago, 12News

Board of Governors 2021-2022

Bob Adlhoch, Phoenix Suns

Dan Barr, Perkins Coie

Sue Breding, City of Glendale

George Davilas, 12News

Jennifer Jones, CBS5 & KTVK 3TV

Danielle Lerner, ABC15

Frankie McLister (Tucson)

Donna Rossi, Buckeye Police Department

Ex-Officio

John Craft, Cronkite School of Journalism and Mass Communication

Genaro Delgadillo, Salt River Project

Miguel Guytan, Telemundo Arizona

Jennifer Kaplan, Evolve Public Relations & Marketing

Chris Kline, Arizona Broadcasters Association 

Patrick McReynolds, McReynolds Media LLC

Joseph Ortiz, Tolleson Union High School District

Özlem Ayse Özgür, Independent Filmmaker (Tucson)

Juan Villa, Univision Arizona

Malachy Wienges, Sedona Broadcasting Company

Emmy Award Recipients

Emmy Award recipients are individuals who show excellence in the field of television. The Emmys are held to the same esteem as the Oscars are to motion pictures or the Grammy Awards are to the music industry

References

Regional Emmy Awards
Awards established in 1959
1959 establishments in Arizona